Independent Municipal & Allied Trade Union v Rustenburg Transitional Council is an important case in South African labour law. The council (the employer in this case) had adopted a resolution that its employees in senior managerial positions would not be permitted to serve in executive positions of trade unions; nor would they be permitted involvement in trade-union activities. The resolution was later amended to remove the prohibition on trade-union activities, but the prohibition on holding executive positions remained.

A union with members employed by the council, and some senior managers who were members of the union, approached the Labour Court for an order declaring the resolution to be in contravention of the Constitution.

The court granted the order, but did indicate that there were limitations to the scope of section 4 of the Labour Relations Act.

It pointed out that, in terms of common-law principles, an employee owed an employer a "duty of fidelity"—that is, a duty to act in good faith—and that, because of the conflicting aims of trade unions and employers, participation in trade-union activities could, in the case of senior managerial employees, breach this duty of fidelity.

See also 
 South African labour law

References 
 Independent Municipal And Allied Trade Union and Others v Rustenburg Transitional Council (J1543/98) [1999] ZALC 145; (2000) 21 ILJ 377 (LC) (17 September 1999).

Notes 

1999 in South African law
1999 in case law
South African labour case law
Labour Court of South Africa cases